Beresford may refer to:

Places
Beresford, British Columbia
 Beresford, Republic of Ireland
 Beresford, Manitoba
Beresford, New Brunswick, a town within Beresford Parish, New Brunswick
Beresford, South Dakota
Beresford, Western Australia

Other uses
Beresford (name)
5682 Beresford, an asteroid
Beresford Hotel, Glasgow, Scotland
The Beresford, a luxury apartment building on Central Park West in New York City

See also
Beresford Dale, in Derbyshire, England
Berisford, a surname